The FIA WTCR Race of Saudi Arabia was a round of the World Touring Car Cup, which was held at the Jeddah Corniche Circuit in Jeddah, Saudi Arabia. The race was the season finale of the 2022 season. Instead of the  grand prix layout, shorter  layout was configured for this touring car race.

Winners

References

Saudi Arabia
World Touring Car Cup